Brimbank Stallions Football Club is an Australian semi-professional soccer club from Sunshine. The club competes in the Victorian State League Division 1 West. The club was founded in 1986 by the local Italian community in Sunshine and the surrounding suburbs of Melbourne's west.

Recent history
Brimbank Stallions FC finished second in the 2015 Victorian State League Division 4 season just missing out on promotion. However the club would go on to win three consecutive promotions in 2016, 2017 and 2018, lifting the club from State 4 to State League 1, the latter two after hiring former National Soccer League player Andrew Marth. 

The club has ambitions to become a National Premier Leagues Victoria club.

References

External links
 Brimbank Stallions FC (official website)

Soccer clubs in Melbourne
Victorian State League teams
Italian-Australian culture in Melbourne
Italian-Australian backed sports clubs of Victoria
1986 establishments in Australia
Association football clubs established in 1986
Sport in the City of Brimbank